Tongs are a type of tool used to grip and lift objects instead of holding them directly with hands. There are many forms of tongs adapted to their specific use.

The first pair of tongs belongs to the Egyptians. Tongs likely started off as basic wooden tongs and then over time progressed to bronze bars as early as 3000BC. Over time they progressed to what we now know as modern-day tongs.

An Egyptian wall painting from 1450 BCE shows a crucible supported between two metal bars. The same painting shows someone holding a small object over a fire with a tong-like instrument. Bronze loops capable of handling heavy crucibles also happened to appear at this time.
 Tongs that have long arms terminating in small flat circular ends of tongs and are pivoted at a joint close to the handle used to handle delicate objects. Common fire-tongs, used for picking up pieces of coal and placing them on a fire without burning fingers or getting them dirty are of this type. Tongs for grilling, tongs for serving salad or spaghetti are kitchen utensils of the same type. They provide a way to move, rotate and turn the food with delicate precision, or fetch a full serving in one grab.
 Tongs consisting of a single band of bent metal, as in sugar tongs, most asparagus tongs (which are no longer common) and the like. Sugar tongs are usually silver, with claw-shaped or spoon-shaped ends for serving lump sugar. Asparagus tongs are usually similar but larger, with a band near the head that limits how far the tongs can expand. Asparagus tongs for serving were introduced in 18th-century England, with smaller versions for eating asparagus appearing in the 19th century.
 Tongs in which the pivot or joint is placed close to the gripping ends are used to handle hard and heavy objects. Driller's round tongs, blacksmith's tongs or crucible tongs are of this type.

Design variations include resting points so that the working end of the tongs does not come into contact with a bench surface.

A myth contained in the classical Jewish text Pirkei Avot states that the first pair of tongs were created by God right before God rested on the Seventh Day.  The reasoning is that a blacksmith must use a pair of tongs in order to fashion a new pair of tongs.  Accordingly, God must have provided humankind with the first pair of tongs.

See also

Fire iron
Food preparation utensils
Forceps
Tweezers

References

Serving utensils
Food preparation utensils
Metalworking hand tools
Tools